Munkebo is a town in central Denmark, located in Kerteminde Municipality in the Region of Southern Denmark on the island of Funen. It was also the site of the municipal council of the abolished Munkebo Municipality. The town had a population of 5,571 as at 1 January 2022.

Odense Steel Shipyard was located in Munkebo.

Notable people 
 Morten Lindberg (born 1965 in Munkebo - 2019) also known as "Master Fatman", was a Danish media personality, comedian, disc jockey, film director, and singer 
 Casper Christensen (born 1968 in Munkebo) a Danish comedian.

References

External links
Kerteminde municipality

Cities and towns in the Region of Southern Denmark
Kerteminde Municipality